El Reino Olvidado (The Forgotten Kingdom) is the ninth studio album by the Argentine band Rata Blanca. The album was edited and released on August 21 of 2008 by PopArt Music. Two weeks after the release date the album obtained the gold album certification.

An English-language version of the album was recorded with Doogie White (Rainbow, Yngwie Malmsteen) on the vocals.  The English version was released on October 28 of 2009.

The album (Spanish version) received a Latin Grammy Award nomination for Best Rock Vocal Album, Duo or Group.

Track listing

Original Version

English Version

Videoclips
 El Reino Olvidado
 El Guardian de la Luz (also used in Guardian of the Light)
 Talismán
 El Circulo de Fuego

Personnel

Band
 Walter Giardino - Guitars / Mixing / Producer
 Adrián Barilari - Vocals
 Guillermo Sanchez † - Bass
 Hugo Bistolfi - Keyboards
 Fernando Scarcella - Drums

Others
Nayla Scalia - Vocals on "Las voces del mar"
Doogie White - Vocals on album English version
Martín Toledo - Sound engineer / Mixing
Nicolás Rodríguez - Recording assistant
Martín Gutiérrez - Recording assistant
Gervasio Gigena - Guitar assistant
Gustavo González - Drum assistant
Claudio Aboy - Album illustrations
Bruno Mencia - Album graphic design
Mayra Cerbán - Packaging / Medals

References

2008 albums
Rata Blanca albums
Spanish-language albums